Kadim Jabbar Al Samarai (born September 12, 1957), better known by his stage name Kadim Al Sahir, is an Iraqi singer and composer.

He typically performs with an orchestra of twenty to thirty musicians on Arabic percussion, oud, qanun, nay, and a full complement of strings (violin, cello, and bass). While some of his work makes use of electronic musical sounds, he avoids the use of synthesizers to imitate acoustic instruments. His work frequently features Iraqi folk instruments, rhythms and melodies.

Biography 
Al Sahir was born in Mosul, Iraq on September 12, 1957, to a Sunni father and a Shia mother from Najaf. His father lived in Baghdad but was a Samarra native from the tribe of Darraj. Kadhem Al Sahir grew up and spent a large part of his life in Al-Hurrya neighborhood in Baghdad.

Apart from his mother, Al Sahir's family were never supportive of his direction in becoming a musician. They had no faith in him that he would become successful, and instead wanted him to become a doctor or a lawyer. Saher's brother once took him to different places where people usually sang, and told him it's your choice to sing a respectful way or you can choose to do it the bad way. He said that the only way to achieve success is if you respect your music and respect yourself.

Al Sahir left Iraq in the early 90s after the Gulf War. He did not have a permanent residence and frequently moved, mainly between Cairo, Dubai, Beirut, and Paris, though as of 2022 he settled with his family in Rabat, Morocco. He has two sons, Wisam and Omar Al Sahir, both of them married. Kadim is also a grandfather to Wisam's daughter Sana.

In February 2019, Kadim officially asked to change his last name from Al Samarai to Al Sahir.

Professional career

1995–2000 
He later moved to Lebanon, where he met and formed a songwriting partnership with Syrian poet Nizar Qabbani in 1996; Qabbani wrote lyrics to his music before settling permanently in Cairo. Qabbani, who previously wrote lyrics for superstars of the 1960s and 1970s like Abdel Halim Hafez and Najat Al Saghira, wrote the lyrics to more than 30 of Al Sahir's songs. In addition to Qabbani's poems, Al Sahir sang both political and romantic songs for Iraq and Baghdad, highlighting the feelings of the citizens of Iraq as well as their tragedies.

Al Sahir continued to release albums and tour, having become a big name in Middle Eastern music. His ballads grew bigger and more romantic, but he would also write classically influenced works, even when they might hurt his popularity.

By 1998, he had ten albums under his belt and was lauded as an artist, not just a pop star. That prestige brought him wider fame and a growing international reputation that won him a UNICEF award for his song "Tathakkar", which he performed in the U.S. for Congress and the United Nations–one of the first real post-Gulf War cultural exchanges. The following year, he recorded a tribute to the Pope with the Italian Symphony Orchestra.

Releasing numerous albums and touring extensively, Al Sahir has become both a high-grossing superstar and a respected musical artist. His reputation has continued to grow through collaborations with European and North American artists, including Sarah Brightman and Lenny Kravitz. He continues to live abroad, residing alternately in Cairo, Dubai, Paris, and Toronto.

2004–present: Collaborations
Following the U.S. invasion of Iraq in 2003, Al Sahir's music changed to reflect new regional and global attention to Iraq during wartime. As scholar Christopher Phillips writes in Everyday Arab Identity (2012): "Although Iraqi singers were not historically that well known due to their isolation from the wider Arab world during Saddam Hussein’s rule, Kathem al-Saher made a name for himself after 2003, singing in classical Arabic, often about the destruction of Iraq under occupation and war. His success might indicate a certain level of Arab solidarity, with viewers opting to show their support for Iraq through the purchase of songs depicting its misfortune."In 2004, Al Sahir collaborated with Lenny Kravitz and released an anti-war song at Rock The Vote, titled "We Want Peace", and shortly afterward released a song entitled "The War Is Over" (Entahat al harab) with Sarah Brightman, which was released on her album Harem and his album Hafiat Al-Kadamain. Both of these international duets were executive produced by Dergham Owainati, of EMI Music Arabia, for Kadim's part.

In 2004, Al Sahir continued to work with various international artists including Grammy Award-winning producers KC Porter, and Quincy Jones. His collaboration "Love & Compassion" (Hob Wa Haneen) was the title track for the Arab American National Museum Collector's edition honoring the artists that have made the most significant difference with international audiences. The track features Grammy winning singer/songwriter Paula Cole, Def Jam recording artist Karina Pasian, and Luis Conte and was produced by KC Porter and Dawn Elder.

In 2004, he participated in the worldwide broadcast concert special "We are the Future" produced by Quincy Jones and coordinated by Dawn Elder at the Roman Maximos Stadium in Rome for the benefit of the children of the world. In December 2004, he participated in the opening of the Gulf Football Championship (Khaleeji 17) in which he performed the return of Iraq Operette which was broadcast live on 10 satellite channels. Additionally, in 2004, he was the first Arab artist to participate in Unity, the official album of the 2004 Summer Olympics.

Releasing his album Ila Tilmitha on November 11, 2004. The album contains collaborations with the Moroccan Asma Lamnawar whom Kadim Al Sahir discovered earlier and introduced to the Arab world in her first due song with Kadim "ashko ayaman". The album also included the song "Ahbeni," written by poet Nizar Qabbani, shot as a video clip by Husien Duibes; it became a major hit in the year 2004 alongside the song "Ila Tilmitha."

UNICEF named Al Sahir as the new Goodwill Ambassador for Iraq for the year 2011. For Al Sahir, this was a compelling reason to visit his country after 14 years

He sang Bokra ("Tomorrow"), a charity single that was released on November 11, 2011, at 11:11 pm, along with Rim Banna, Akon, Tamer Hosni, Diana Karazon, Marwan Khoury, Latifa, Souad Massi, Hani Mitwassi, Saber El Robai, Wa'ed, Sherine, and other Arab artists. The single distributed the proceeds of its donations to various organisations, especially institutions and charities with arts and culture programs. The eight-minute song was written by Majida Al-Roumi and was produced by Quincy Jones and RedOne.

He debuted as a coach for MBC The Voice Kids, and his team member Lynn Hayek from Lebanon was the winning contestant in the Season 1 Finale held on March 5, 2016.

In collaboration with an Abu Dhabi cultural foundation, he performed solo in his first virtual hybrid concert in 2020 due to the pandemic.

In 2020, he was the cover start of Vogue Man Arabia.

Discography

Albums 
 Shajarat Al Zaytoon (The Olive Tree) (1984)
 Ghazal (Gazelle) (1989) [Music Box International]
 Al Aziz (The Beloved) (1990) [Al-Nazaer Media Group]
 Hatha Alloun (This Color) (1992) [Stallions Records]
 La Ya Sadiki (No, My Friend) (1993) [Music Master]
 Banat Alaebak (Your Tricks are Over) (1993) [Stallions Records]
 Salamtak Min El Ah (Your Safety From Hardships) (1994) [Rotana Records]
 Baad ElHob (After Love) (1995) [Relax-In Records]
 Eghsely Belbarad (Wash My Heart With Hail) (1996) [Rotana Records]
 Fi Madrasat Al Hob (In the School of Love) (November 23, 1996) [Rotana Records]
 Ana Wa Laila (Laila and I) (November 28, 1997) [Rotana Records]
 Habibati Wal Matar (My Love & The Rain) (January 1, 1999) [Rotana Records]
 Al Hob Al Mustaheel (The Impossible Love) (July 27, 2000) [Rotana Records]
 Abhathu Anki (Looking For You) (September 28, 2001) [Rotana Records]
 Qussat Habebain (A Story of Two Lovers) (January 1, 2002) [Rotana Records]
 Hafiat Al Kadamain (Barefooted) (June 29, 2003) [Rotana Records]
 Ila Tilmitha (To a Student) (November 11, 2004) [Rotana Records]
 Entaha Almeshwar (The Journey Is Over) (November 1, 2005) [Rotana Records]
 Yawmyat Rajoul Mahzoom (Diary of a Defeated Man) (March 29, 2007) [Rotana Records]
 Sowar (Pictures) (September 29, 2008) [Rotana Records]
 Al Rassem Bil Kalimat (Drawing with Words) (October 12, 2009) [Rotana Records]
 Latizidih Lawa'a (Don't Add Anguish to Him) (January 2, 2011) [Rotana Records]
 Kitab Al Hob (The Book of Love) (September 20, 2016) [Platinum Records]

International concerts 
Kadim Al Sahir tours around the world performing for his mostly Arab fans. He has performed in many countries, including the USA, Canada, France, Germany, Italy, Australia, and England. Major venues include:

Royal Albert Hall in 1997, 2004 and 2006.
Sydney Opera House, 2002 and 2022.
Sydney Olympic Park, 2016
Beacon Theatre in New York 2003.
The Circus Maximus in Rome where Kadim was a part of "Live from Rome's Circus Maximus" (May 16, 2004). Participants in this concert included other artists such as Carlos Santana, Alicia Keys, Norah Jones and Andrea Bocelli. Famous international producer Quincy Jones warmly introduced Kadim Al Sahir to Rome's concert attendees whose number exceeded 500,000.
Hammersmith Apollo in January 2019 (Middle East Eye)

References

External links
 

Kadim Al Sahir on Spotify

1957 births
Living people
Iraqi anti-war activists
20th-century Iraqi male singers
Iraqi male film actors
Iraqi male television actors
People from Mosul
Singers who perform in Classical Arabic
Rotana Records artists
Iraqi composers
Iraqi Muslims
21st-century Iraqi male singers